Maurice is a traditionally masculine given name, also used as a surname. It originates as a French name derived from the Latin Mauritius or Mauricius and was subsequently used in other languages. Its popularity is due to Mauritius, a saint of the Theban Legion (died 287). Mauritius is otherwise attested as a given name of the Roman Empire period, in origin meaning "one from Mauritania", i.e. "the Moor". 

Forms in other languages include: Latvian Māris, Spanish Mauricio, Portuguese Maurício, Italian Maurizio, Dutch Maurits,  Greek Μαυρίκιος (Mavrikios), Russian Маврикий (Mavrikiy), German Moritz, Czech Mořic, English Morris. In the form Morris, it is also used as a secularized version of the Jewish name Moishe.

Given name
Late Antiquity to Middle Ages 
Saint Maurice also Moritz, Morris, or Mauritius (died 287), Roman legionnaire and Christian martyr
Maurice (emperor) or Flavius Mauricius Tiberius Augustus (539–602), Byzantine emperor
Maurice (bishop) (died 1107), bishop of London, Lord Chancellor and Lord Keeper of England
Maurice of Carnoet (1117–1191), French abbot and saint
Maurice, Count of Oldenburg (fl. 1169–1211), count of Oldenburg
Mauritius (Dean of Armagh) (fl. 13th century), Irish cleric, Dean of Armagh 1238
Maurice of Inchaffray (14th century), Scottish bishop
Maurice Spata (14th to early 15th century), Albanian ruler of Arta from 1399 to 1414/15

Early Modern
Maurice, Elector of Saxony (1521–1553), German Saxon nobleman
Maurice, Duke of Saxe-Lauenburg (1551–1612), duke of Saxe-Lauenburg
Maurice, Landgrave of Hesse-Kassel or Maurice the Learned (1572–1632), Landgrave of Hesse-Kassel
Maurice of Nassau, Prince of Orange (1567–1625), stadtholder of the Netherlands
Maurice of Savoy (1593–1657), prince of Savoy and a cardinal
Maurice, Duke of Saxe-Zeitz (1619–1681), duke of Saxe-Zeitz
Maurice of the Palatinate (1620–1652), Count Palatine of the Rhine
William Maurice, Prince of Nassau-Siegen (1649–1691), prince of Nassau-Siegen

Modern
Maurice of Battenberg (1891–1914), prince of the Battenberg family and member of the British Royal Family
Maurice of the Netherlands (1843–1850), prince of Orange-Nassau
Maurice Anderson (born 1975), American football player
Maurice Binder (1918–1991), American film title designer
Maurice Blanchot (1907–2003), French writer, philosopher, and literary theorist
Maurice Bowra (1898–1971), English classical scholar and academic
Maurice de Bus (1907–1963), French sculptor
Maurice Riemer Calhoun, Sr. (1909–1994), American politician 
Maurice Chevalier, (1888–1972), French actor, singer and entertainer
Maurice Cowling (1926–2005), British historian
Maurice Crum (disambiguation), multiple people
Maurice Deligne (1861–1939), French politician
Maurice Duplessis (1890–1959), 16th Premier of Quebec, Canada
Maurice Duval (1869–1958), French general and aviator
Maurice Evans (disambiguation), multiple people
Maurice Failevic (1933-2016), French film director
Maurice Ffrench (born 1998), American football player
Maurice Elwood Frump (1901–1979), American football player
Maurice Gambier d'Hurigny (1912–2000), French sculptor
Maurice Gamelin (1872–1958), French general remembered for his unsuccessful command of the French military in 1940 during the Battle of France
Maurice Garin (1871–1957), French road bicycle racer best known for winning the inaugural Tour de France in 1903, and for being stripped of his title in the second Tour in 1904 for cheating
Maurice Gibb (1949–2003), British singer, songwriter, multi-instrumentalist, and record producer
Maurice Greene (athlete), American sprinter
Maurice Grevisse (1895–1980), Belgian grammarian
Maurice Healy (campaigner) (1933–2020), British consumer campaigner
Maurice Howard, British art historian
Maurice Hurst Jr. (born 1995), American football player
Maurice Kemp (born 1991), American basketball player in the Israeli Basketball Premier League
Maurice LaMarche, Canadian actor 
Maurice Leblanc (1864–1941), French novelist and writer
Maurice Leyland (1900–1967), English cricketer 
Maurice Meisner (1931–2012), historian of 20th century China
Maurice de Mel, Sri Lankan Sinhala army colonel
Maurice Merleau-Ponty (1908–1961), French phenomenological philosopher  
 Maurice Joseph Micklewhite, birth name of Michael Caine, English actor 
Maurice O'Neill (Irish republican), (d.1942)Executed Irish Republican 
Maurice Pluskota (born 1992), German basketball player        
Maurice Ravel (1875–1937), French Impressionist music composer and pianist
Maurice Rioli (1957–2010), Australian football player
Maurice Roëves (1937–2020), English actor
Maurice Rozenthal (born 1975), French ice hockey player
Maurice Ruah (born 1971), Venezuelan tennis player
Maurice Sendak (1928–2012), American known for Where the Wild Things Are
Maurice K. Smith (1926–2020), New Zealand-born American architect
Maurice Salvador Sreshta (1872-1952), Postmaster General of Sri Lanka from 1923-1928
Maurice Stuckey (born 1990), German basketball player
Maurice Schwartz (1889–1960), Russian-born actor
Maurice Tornay (1910–1949), Swiss Catholic missionary
Maurice Tulloch (born 1969), British/Canadian businessman
Maurice Vinot (1888–1916), French film actor
Maurice de Vlaminck (1876–1958), French painter, one of the principals in the Fauve movement
Maurice Watson (born 1993), American basketball player for Maccabi Rishon LeZion of the Israeli Basketball Premier League
Maurice Wilkins (1916–2004), New Zealand-born English physicist and molecular biologist, and Nobel Laureate

Fictional characters
Maurice, a character from the 1991 film Beauty and the Beast
Maurice, Samantha Steven's father in Bewitched.
Maurice, a monster character in the 1989 film Little Monsters
Maurice Lalonde (Highlander character), character in the television program Highlander: The Series
Maurice Levy (The Wire), character in the television program The Wire
Maurice Moss, character from the British sitcom The IT Crowd
Rap Master Maurice, a character portrayed by artist Derek Erdman
Maurice Olgilvie Hedgehog, real name of Sonic the Hedgehog
Maurice Hall, protagonist in the book Maurice by E.M. Forster

Surname
Ann Maurice (born 1951), American interior designer and house stager, called "The House Doctor"
Arthur Bartlett Maurice (1873–1946), American editor of the Woodbridge (NJ) Register
Benoît Maurice (born 1971), French football central defender
Charles G. Maurice (1911–1997), American teacher of dentistry and pioneer of endodontics 
Clément Maurice (1853–1933), French photographer
David Maurice (1626–1702), Welsh priest and translator
David M. Maurice (1922–2002), British ophthalmologist 
Emil Maurice (1897–1972), German watchmaker and senior Nazi Party official
Florian Maurice (born 1974), French footballer
Frederick Barton Maurice (1871–1951), British general, military correspondent, writer and academic
Frederick Denison Maurice (1805–1872), British author, theologian, and socialist
Henry Maurice (minister) (1634–1682), Welsh priest who became an Independent minister
Henry Maurice (theologian) (c. 1647 – 1691), Welsh clergyman and professor
Henry Gascoyne Maurice (1847–1950), English zoologist 
Hugh Maurice (1775-1825), transcriber of Welsh manuscripts
James Maurice (1814–1884), American politician from New York
James Wilkes Maurice (1775–1857), United Kingdom Royal Navy officer
Jean-Eudes Maurice (born 1986), French-born Haitian footballer
John D. Maurice, American writer and Pulitzer Prize winner
John Frederick Maurice (1841–1912), English soldier and military writer
María Belén Pérez Maurice (born 1985), Argentinian fencer
Mary Maurice (1844–1918), American actress
Mathias Maurice (1684-1738), Welsh minister and writer
Monica Maurice (1908 – 1995) industrialist, first, and for 40 years the only, woman member of the Association of Mining Electrical Engineers, known as “the Lady of the Lamp”.
Paul Maurice (born 1967), Canadian hockey player and coach
Paule Maurice (1910–1967), French composer
Peter Maurice (priest) (1803–1878), Welsh priest and writer
Peter Maurice (bishop) (born 1951), English cleric - bishop of Taunton
Richard Maurice (1893– fl. 1951), Cuban-American filmmaker and labor organizer
Thomas Maurice (fl. 1755–1824), English poet oriental scholar, historian, chaplain and vicar
William Maurice (politician) (1552–1622), Welsh politician (an anglicization of his patronymic, ap Morys)
William Maurice (antiquary) (1620-1680), Welsh antiquary and collector of manuscripts

English masculine given names
French masculine given names
English-language masculine given names
Lists of people by given name
Surnames from given names